North Carolina Education Lottery 200 may refer to:
North Carolina Education Lottery 200 (Charlotte), a NASCAR race held at Charlotte Motor Speedway starting in 2008
North Carolina Education Lottery 200 (Rockingham), a NASCAR race held at Rockingham Speedway from 2012 to 2013